John Thynne, 3rd Baron Carteret PC (28 December 1772 – 10 March 1849), known as Lord John Thynne between 1789 and 1838, was a British peer and politician.

Background and education
Carteret was the third son of Thomas Thynne, 1st Marquess of Bath, and Lady Elizabeth Bentinck, daughter of William Bentinck, 2nd Duke of Portland. He was educated at St John's College, Cambridge.

Political career
Carteret was returned to Parliament for Weobly in May 1796, a seat he held until December the same year, and then represented Bath between 1796 and 1832. He served as Vice-Chamberlain of the Household from 1804 to 1812 and was sworn into the Privy Council in 1804.

In 1838 he succeeded his childless elder brother George in the barony and took his seat in the House of Lords.

Marriage
In 1801 Lord Carteret married Mary Anne Master (died February 1863), daughter of Thomas Master. They had no children.

Death and succession
He died at his house Hawnes Park in March 1849, aged 76. On his death the barony became extinct, while the estate passed to his nephew the Rev. Lord John Thynne, third son of Thomas Thynne, 2nd Marquess of Bath and sub-Dean of Westminster.

References

External links

1772 births
Alumni of St John's College, Cambridge
Thynne, John
Members of the Parliament of Great Britain for English constituencies
British MPs 1796–1800
Members of the Parliament of the United Kingdom for English constituencies
UK MPs 1801–1802
UK MPs 1802–1806
UK MPs 1806–1807
UK MPs 1807–1812
UK MPs 1812–1818
UK MPs 1818–1820
UK MPs 1820–1826
UK MPs 1826–1830
UK MPs 1830–1831
UK MPs 1831–1832
UK MPs who inherited peerages
Politics of Bath, Somerset
3
John
1849 deaths